The Titusville Police Department (TPD) is the police force with the primary responsibility of public safety and the enforcement of state laws and county/municipal ordinances in the city of Titusville, Florida. In 2018, the department consisted of 137 full-time personnel and 17 part-time personnel. Full-time personnel includes sworn members, 911 dispatchers, code enforcement, and non-sworn civilians. The department also contained part-time personnel, like school crossing guards or record clerks.

Organization

The Titusville Police Department, headed by the Chief of Police, is organized into six divisions: the Patrol Division, the Investigations Division, the Professional Standards Division, the Administrative Division, the Support Services Division, and the Tactical Operations Division.  The Patrol Division and the Investigations Division together make up the Operations Bureau, which is headed by the Assistant Chief, while one major supervises each division.

Vehicles
In 2018, TPD had a total fleet of 125 vehicles, including marked and unmarked patrol cars (most of which are Chevrolet Caprice and Chevrolet Impala), undercover vehicles, sport utility vehicles, Community Service Officer vehicles, ATVs, golf carts, two crime scene vans, a SWAT truck, and many other vehicles necessary for responding to the multitude of different calls for service it receives. Titusville also has confiscated vehicles that are used for investigations as well as senior staff cars.

A 1949 Ford police car was also refurbished and used by the department, in events like car shows and parades.

The current fleet of the Titusville Police Department is composed of 2013 Chevy Caprices, a number of Impalas, and a couple of Ford Crown Victorias. The department changed its marking scheme in October 2010 to a more up to date look. The current markings were picked from several designs. In 2013, the department decided to change the look of the new marked vehicles. The new fleet of marked Chevy Caprices sport a classic black and white color scheme. Older patrol cars are still dressed in white with blue markings. The department's Traffic Unit cars are all unmarked.

Community Watch

Established in 1993, Titusville Police Department initiated a program for citizens to help be the eyes and ears of the department.  The program puts citizens through a class after which they are allowed to patrol the streets and residential neighborhoods as well as business parking lots looking for any signs of suspicious and unusual activities. Along with the visible presence they provide areas, they provide valuable assistance to the officers on the street.  At no time do Community Watch members become involved in arrests or violent situations.  They handle only non-confrontational duties and report activity to police dispatchers via two-way radio. Community Watch members wear a marked, gold "Polo" shirt and black pants, and do not carry weapons nor a firearm.

Community Watch Volunteers can be seen helping direct traffic during launches from the nearby Kennedy Space Center, as well as helping during the Downtown Titusville Drive-In events held on Friday nights. Community Watch volunteers also support the TPD during the annual Christmas Parade, missing person searches, and at crime scenes.

Newsletter

TPD has a newsletter, called the TPD Shield, which it uses to communicate with the community as a crime prevention tool. This awareness-raising publication is paid for by forfeiture funds at no cost to the taxpayer.

Line-of-Duty Deaths

Officer Jack Henry Schnell, ID 716, was killed on New Year's Eve 1982. While he was on motor DUI patrol, a drunk driver pulled out in front of Officer Schnell's motor, causing a collision which threw him from the motorcycle, and he landed on his head. Later, in the hospital, Officer Schnell died of the severe head injuries he sustained. Being an officer involved crash, the incident was investigated not by TPD but by the Florida Highway Patrol. State Troopers charged the driver with DUI/Manslaughter, of which he was convicted and sentenced to 25 years in prison. At the time of the manslaughter, Officer Schnell was 35 years old and had served TPD for 14 years.

Officer Stephen Franklin House, ID 726, was shot and killed on February 15, 1989. Officer House was conducting a building search (private residence) with the emergency response team. During this operation, the suspect was taken into custody (a teen, charged with selling a small amount of marijuana), but his father, asleep in his own bed and awakened by his front door being kicked in, grabbed a gun from his bedside drawer and fired at the man dressed in all black coming into his room. This resulted in Officer House receiving a fatal gunshot wound. The gunman was charged with murder, but he was acquitted and released as it was proven that the police failed to announce that they were cops as they entered the residence. At the time of the homicide, Officer House was 36 years old and had served TPD for 7 years.

References

Municipal police departments of Florida
Titusville, Florida